Gabrielle Colvin (born 1 March 1991) is an Australian rules footballer playing for the Melbourne Football Club in the AFL Women's (AFLW). Colvin was drafted by Melbourne with their third selection and seventy-seventh overall in the 2019 AFL Women's draft. She made her debut against  at Casey Fields in the opening round of the 2020 season.

References

External links 

1991 births
Living people
Melbourne Football Club (AFLW) players
Darebin Falcons players
Australian rules footballers from Victoria (Australia)